Esther Qin (born 18 November 1991) is a Chinese-born Australian retired diver.

Personal life
Esther was born and raised in a family of Zhuang people, an ethnic minority of China. Her family moved to Australia in 2009 as her father had managed to find a position as a chef.

Diving career

In China
Qin started diving at the age of eleven in China and competed in several national competitions.

For Australia
Qin competed at the 2013 Summer Universiade in Kazan, Russia, won a silver medal in the 3m synchronised with Samantha Mills. She also competed in the 1 m and 3 m springboard.
At the 2014 Commonwealth Games in Glasgow, Scotland, she won the gold medal in the women's 3m springboard, a bronze medal in women's 1m springboard and came 4th in the women's synchronised 3 metre springboard alongside Anna Gelai. She was coached by Chava Sobrino at the New South Wales Institute of Sport.

At the 2015 World Aquatics Championships, Kazan, Russia, she won a bronze medal in the 3m synchronized with Samantha Mills.

She competed at the 2016 Olympics where she finished 6th in the women's 3 metre springboard event.

Qin partnered with Georgia Sheehan in the 2018 Commonwealth Games to achieve first place and received a gold medal in the 3m synchronised springboard event. Qin also won a bronze medal in the women's 1m springboard event and came 5th in the women's 3 metre springboard event.

Qin qualified for the Tokyo 2020 Olympics where she came 12th in the women's 3-metre springboard event.

She competed at the 2022 Commonwealth Games where she came 5th in the women's synchronised 3 metre springboard evnt alongside Brittany O'Brien and 6th in the women's 1 metre springboard event.

Qin announced her retirement from international diving on December 5 2022.

References

External links
 
 
 
 
 
 
 
 

1991 births
Living people
Australian female divers
World Aquatics Championships medalists in diving
Olympic divers of Australia
Divers at the 2016 Summer Olympics
Commonwealth Games medallists in diving
Commonwealth Games gold medallists for Australia
Commonwealth Games bronze medallists for Australia
Divers at the 2018 Commonwealth Games
Divers at the 2014 Commonwealth Games
Divers at the 2022 Commonwealth Games
Universiade medalists in diving
Universiade silver medalists for Australia
Medalists at the 2013 Summer Universiade
Divers at the 2020 Summer Olympics
Australian sportspeople of Chinese descent
Sportswomen from New South Wales
People from Liuzhou
Zhuang people
Sportspeople from Guangxi
Medallists at the 2014 Commonwealth Games
Medallists at the 2018 Commonwealth Games